The Public Attorney's Office of the Republic of Serbia is regulated by The Law on Public Attorney's Office (abbr. LoPAO). It determines that the measures of legal protection of rights and interests of the Republic of Serbia in private law matters are undertaken by the Public Attorney's Office with the headquarters in Belgrade, Serbia. The Public Attorney's Office performs its function according to laws and other regulations which are in compliance with the Constitution and the law.

Distinction should be made between the Public Attorney's Office of the Republic of Serbia and the Public Defender (which is, in some countries, also referred to as public attorney or public attorney's office), because these are two different institutions. Public Attorney's Office of the Republic of Serbia performs functions witch in English and other languages to refer to as the State Attorney or Attorney General.

The current Public Attorney of the Republic of Serbia is Olivera Stanimirović, appointed by the Government of the Republic of Serbia.

History
The institution of a public attorney's office (Attorney General - State Attorney) has a long tradition in Serbia. Since the year of 1842, in, then existing, Principality of Serbia, the State Financial Manager was established as a separate organ of the state, with the competence to perform the duty of a state attorney. This separate organ of the state was abolished only after a year, and the function of a state attorney's office was sent back within the competence of the Ministry of finance. However, within that Ministry, the function of the state attorney's office was always performed by particular employees - State Attorney, of which fact we can find a trace in the Manual for a State Attorney from the year of 1848. In this form, the State Attorney's Office existed in Serbia until the year of 1934, when a Law on the State Attorney's Office came to power. By this Law, for the first time, the position and organization of the State Attorney's Office as a separate organ of the state within the Ministry of finance, was established in whole details. After World War II, the name was changed to the State Attorney's Office in the Public Attorney's Office, without essential change of competencies of this organ.

Competences
The Public Attorney is the person who represents the state's authorities in the courts and administrative bodies, and advises the government in civil law matters. As such, crimes and offences are prosecuted by the Public Prosecutor.

The competence of The Public Attorney's Office is determined by Articles 7–10, 12 and 13 of LoPAO, according to which The Public Attorney's Office:

 undertakes legal measures and uses legal instruments in front of courts and other competent bodies, for the purpose of realization of rights and interests of the Republic of Serbia, its organs and organizations, as well as other legal persons, the financing of which is being provided from the budget of the Republic of Serbia or other sources provided by the Republic, in private law matters; in those procedures, The Public Attorney's Office represents the Republic of Serbia and its organs and organizations as a legal representative;
 can represent other legal persons regarding their rights and interests in private law matters, in cases that interests of those legal persons are not in confrontation with the function The Public Attorney's Office performs;
 can initiate the initiative for estimation of constitutionality and legality of laws, other regulations and general acts in front of the Constitutional Court, in situations when the interest of the Republic of Serbia is being jeopardized.
 undertakes necessary actions, prior to initiating a lawsuit, or other procedure, for amicable settlements in cases the nature of a dispute allows it; a legal or civil person tending to initiate a procedure against the Republic of Serbia or against a legal person of which the legal rights and interests are represented by The Public Attorney's Office, can submit a proposal for the amicable settlement to The Public Attorney's Office. Within a deadline of 30 days, The Public Attorney's Office has a duty to inform the party about undertaken measures and their results;
 provides the legal persons it represents, with legal opinions on contracts and other private law issues, within 30 days, starting from the moment of the delivery of a request.
The competence of The Public Attorney's Office is also determined by a range of other laws and other legal documents. A part of that competence represents specially emphasized role of The Public Attorney's Office as a legal representative of the Republic of Serbia or a legal advisor of the state organs in specific legal procedures, that is to say, specific legal situations. The other part of that special competence refers to situations in which The Public Attorney's Office acts not as a legal representative of the Republic of Serbia, but as an independent party in a procedure. Some of these special competences are determined by the following regulations:
 The Law on Trade of Real Estate (“Official Herald of the Republic of Serbia” no. 42/98 and 111/09) – submitting lawsuits for the annulment of contracts on the basis of which a legal person deprives a real estate from the state or social property, or acquires a real estate to the state or social property, in cases that the stipulated price is in a disproportion with the turnover value of a real estate at the time of the conclusion of a contract, damaging that way the state or social property,
 The Law on Public Property (“Official Herald of the Republic of Serbia” no. 72/11), Article 38, submitting lawsuits for the annulment of contracts which deprive or acquire real estate property of the Republic of Serbia, which are concluded in a contradiction to regulations, that is to say, if a stipulated compensation is in a disproportion with a determined compensation or a compensation which could be achieved at the time of the conclusion of a contract,
 The Law on Public Property (“Official Herald of the Republic of Serbia” no. 72/11), Article 84, paragraph 2. and 3, submitting lawsuits for estimating the share of state property in assets which a legal person is using, which are built, or acquired by the share of the assets of the Republic of Serbia, the Province, the Municipality, or the City,
 The Law on Planning and Construction (“Official Herald of the Republic of Serbia” no. 72/09, 81/09, 64/10, 24/11, 121/12, 42/13 and 50/13), Article 68 – giving approval to the request of the owner or the lease holder of a parcel, for the correction of the border of a parcel, by incorporating of the building land in public property to existing parcel, in order to form a cadastral parcel which fulfills the conditions of a building parcel, on the basis of parcelation project,
 The Law on Planning and Construction, Article 100 – submit requests for registration of public property on the basis of conversion of the right to use, on unbuilt and built land in the state property,
 The Law on property restitution and compensation („Official Herald of the Republic of Serbia” no. 72/11), Article 39, - taking part as a party in all procedures for property restitution and compensation,
 The Law of Administrative Litigations („Official Herald of the Republic of Serbia” no. 111/09), Article 11, paragraph 4. – filing administrative litigations if by an administrative act rights and interests of the Republic of Serbia in private law matters are being violated,
 The Law on Public Acquisitions („Official Herald of the Republic of Serbia” no. 124/12), Article 148, paragraph 3 – filing requests in the case of violation of public interest in the procedure of public acquisition,
 The Law on Companies („Official Herald of the Republic of Serbia” no. 36/11 and 99/11), Article 27, paragraph 3. – filing lawsuits for a change of a business name of a company by which public morality is violated,
 The Law on Civil Procedure (“Official Herald of the Republic of Serbia” no. 72/11), Article 193, – amicable settlements before starting a litigation in the civil procedure. Every person tending to file a lawsuit against the Republic of Serbia is obliged to file a request for amicable settlement. It is a special kind of extra judicial settlement with the effect of enforceable document,
 The Book of Regulations of the Government (“Official Herald of the Republic of Serbia” no. 61/06, 69/08, 88/09, 33/10, 69/10, 20/10, 37/11 and 30/13), Article 46, paragraph 2 - giving legal opinions to proposals of acts which are submitted to the Government to adopt, if an act concerns protection of rights and interests of the Republic of Serbia in private law matters or contractual obligations for the Republic of Serbia are being created.
The Public Attorney's Office also actively participates in most complex procedures in front of the arbitration councils of the International Chamber of Commerce, in the cases that the Republic of Serbia is the party.

In the cases the Public Attorney's Office acts as a legal representative, courts and other bodies are obliged to deliver all documents directly to the competent Public Attorney's Office. The deliveries which are in contradiction with this Article produce no legal effect (Articles 11. and 17. of LoPAO). If a delivery is not carried out directly to the Public Attorney's Office, that means that the Public Attorney's Office is prevented to act as equal party in the procedure, which represents the essential violation of civil procedure provisions (Article 374. paragraph 2 . item 7. of the Law on Civil Procedure). If a decision is achieved in a contradiction with the provisions concerning delivery, it can be challenged by an appeal for above mentioned reasons.

The Public Attorney's Office has a right to claim court costs which are calculated by the same Tariff used by the Bar Association. However, the awarded costs are transferred not to the Public Attorney's Office, but to the State budget (Article 15. of the LoPAO).

Organization
The function of the Public Attorney's Office executes the Public Attorney, who is appointed by the Government for the period of 4 (four) years and can be reappointed. The Public Attorney has deputies, which are appointed by the Government. They execute their duty as a permanent assignment. The function of the Public Attorney or its deputy can perform a person that is a citizen of the Republic of Serbia fulfills general terms for establishing work relations in the state organs, graduated from the Faculty of Law and have 8 (eight) years of working experience in the field.

The Public Attorney is responsible for his/her work and the work of the Public Attorney's Office to the Government, while the deputies are responsible to the Public Attorney and the Government.

The tasks in the jurisdiction of the Public Attorney's Office of the Republic of Serbia are carried out in the headquarters and in eleven sections outside the headquarters as follows: 	
 Section in Valjevo - for the territory of Kolubara and Macva administrative district;
 Section in Zajecar - for the territory of Bor and Zajecar administrative district;
 Section in Zrenjanin - for the territory of Mid-Banat, South Banat and North Banat administrative district;
 Section in Kraljevo – for the territory of Raska, Rasina and Moravica administrative district;
 Section in Kragujevac – for the territory of Sumadija and Pomoravlje administrative district;
 Section in Leskovac – for the territory of Jablanica, Pcinja, Kosovo-Pomoravlje, Kosovska Mitrovica, Pec, Prizren and Kosovo administrative district;
 Section in Nis – for the territory of Nisava, Pirot and Toplica administrative district;
 Section in Novi Sad - for the territory of South Backa and Syrmia administrative district;
 Section in Pozarevac - for the territory of Branicevo and Podunavlje administrative district;
 Section in Subotica – for the territory of North Backa and West Backa administrative district;
 Section in Uzice – for the territory of Zlatibor administrative district.

The Secretariat exists as a separate internal unit at the Public Attorney` s Office. Within the Secretariat, duties of interest for the entire Public Attorney's Office are being performed (normative, administrative, financial), and the coordination between the headquarters and the departments is being realized. The integral part of the Sekretariat is the Registry.

Regarding organization and competence of the Public Attorney's Office, the Law on the Public Attorney's Office determines that the above-mentioned are regulated in accordance with the regulations of the Law on Ministries. Rights of the employees of the Public Attorney's Office that derive from work, and their obligations are regulated by regulations concerning working relations in the state organs.

References

External links
 Official page of Public Attorney's Office of the Republic of Serbia

Attorneys general
Government agencies of Serbia
Law of Serbia